Lambda Ceti, Latinized from λ Ceti, is B-type star of fifth-magnitude located in the constellation Cetus. Historically, the star bore the traditional name Menkar, although today that name is more commonly associated with α Ceti.

This star, along with α Cet (Menkar), γ Cet (Kaffaljidhma), δ Cet, μ Cet, ξ1 Cet and ξ2 Cet were Al Kaff al Jidhmah, "the Part of a Hand".

Properties 

Lambda Ceti is a blue giant star with stellar classification B6III. In 1997 the Hipparcos satellite estimated its parallax at 7.69 ± 0.76 milliarcseconds yielding a distance from Earth of about 130 ± 10 parsecs or 420 ± 40 light years. However recent astrometric calculations by van Leeuwen have placed the distance much farther at about 177 ± 7 pc or 580 ± 20 ly—a revaluation which significantly altered other stellar parameters. Its apparent magnitude has been recently recalibrated at 4.6767 yielding an absolute magnitude of -1.56, almost as bright as its neighbor Alpha Ceti at -1.62.

References 

B-type giants
Cetus (constellation)
Ceti, Lambda
BD+08 0455
Ceti, 91
018604
013954
0896